Glenn Horiuchi (February 27, 1955 – June 3, 2000) was an American jazz pianist, composer, and shamisen player. He was a central figure in the development of the Asian American jazz movement.

He gave performances all around the world for example at the Berlin Jazz Festival, Vancouver Jazz Festival, Mexico's Japan Fest, Seattle's Earshot Festival, Asian American Jazz Festival in San Francisco and Chicago, New York's Japan and Asia Societies, Los Angeles Festival, at Yale University, and Brown University.

Horiuchi performed with Joseph Jarman, Wadada Leo Smith, George E. Lewis, John Tchicai, Art Davis, Francis Wong, Miya Masaoka, Tatsu Aoki, William Roper, Mark Izu, and San Jose Taiko. He recorded for the Asian Improv and Soul Note labels.

He also lectured and gave workshops at universities around the U.S. such as U.C. Berkeley, Wesleyan University, Northeastern University, and Stanford University. Horiuchi had many diverse talents and interests: besides attending graduate school in mathematics he had work experience as an auto mechanic, construction worker, and music teacher. He also had a long history of student and community activism including the campaign for Japanese Americans to win Redress/Reparations for the World War II incarceration in American concentration camps.

He served as an Artist in Residence teaching at the Japanese American National Museum in Los Angeles, California. He was also a Zen practitioner of the Kwan Um School.

Horiuchi was diagnosed with colon cancer in August 1999, and died on June 3, 2000. His final concert was held at the Japan America Theater a few months before his death.

Discography

As leader/co-leader

As sideman

What's the Difference Between, Miya Masaoka, Victo 0058, 1998

Golden Hearts Remembrance, Leo Smith, Chap Chap CPCD 002, 1997

Pilgrimage, Francis Wong, Music and Arts CD-974, 1997

Devotee, Francis Wong/ Genny Lim, Asian Improv AIR-0030, 1997

The Asian American Experience, Primary Source Media 7909 (CD-Rom), 1997

Sounds like 1996: Music by Asian American Artists, IEL 0002 1996

RMB Sampler, various artists, Marc Sabatella, 1996

Family, Anthony Brown, Asian Improv AIR-0027, 1996

Ming, Francis Wong, Asian Improv AIR-0020, 1995

References

External links
Glenn Horiuchi

See also
Asian American jazz

American musicians of Japanese descent
American jazz composers
American male jazz composers
American jazz pianists
American male pianists
1955 births
2000 deaths
Shamisen players
Avant-garde jazz pianists
20th-century American composers
20th-century American pianists
20th-century American male musicians
Music & Arts artists
Black Saint/Soul Note artists
20th-century jazz composers